Neutron diffraction or elastic neutron scattering is the application of neutron scattering to the determination of the atomic and/or magnetic structure of a material. A sample to be examined is placed in a beam of thermal or cold neutrons to obtain a diffraction pattern that provides information of the structure of the material. The technique is similar to X-ray diffraction but due to their different scattering properties, neutrons and X-rays provide complementary information: X-Rays are suited for superficial analysis, strong x-rays from synchrotron radiation are suited for shallow depths or thin specimens, while neutrons having high penetration depth are suited for bulk samples.

Instrumental and sample requirements
The technique requires a source of neutrons. Neutrons are usually produced in a nuclear reactor or spallation source. At a research reactor, other components are needed, including a crystal monochromator (in the case of thermal neutrons), as well as filters to select the desired neutron wavelength. Some parts of the setup may also be movable. For the long-wavelength neutrons, crystals cannot be used and gratings are used instead as diffractive optical components.  At a spallation source, the time of flight technique is used to sort the energies of the incident neutrons (higher energy neutrons are faster), so no monochromator is needed, but rather a series of aperture elements synchronized to filter neutron pulses with the desired wavelength.

The technique is most commonly performed as powder diffraction, which only requires a polycrystalline powder. Single crystal work is also possible, but the crystals must be much larger than those that are used in single-crystal X-ray crystallography. It is common to use crystals that are about 1 mm3.

The technique also requires a device that can detect the neutrons after they have been scattered.

Summarizing, the main disadvantage to neutron diffraction is the requirement for a nuclear reactor. For single crystal work, the technique requires relatively large crystals, which are usually challenging to grow. The advantages to the technique are many - sensitivity to light atoms, ability to distinguish isotopes, absence of radiation damage, as well as a penetration depth of several cm

Nuclear scattering
Like all quantum particles, neutrons can exhibit wave phenomena typically associated with light or sound. Diffraction is one of these phenomena; it occurs when waves encounter obstacles whose size is comparable with the wavelength. If the wavelength of a quantum particle is short enough, atoms or their nuclei can serve as diffraction obstacles. When a beam of neutrons emanating from a reactor is slowed and selected properly by their speed, their wavelength lies near one angstrom (0.1 nanometer), the typical separation between atoms in a solid material. Such a beam can then be used to perform a diffraction experiment. Impinging on a crystalline sample, it will scatter under a limited number of well-defined angles, according to the same Bragg's law that describes X-ray diffraction.

Neutrons and X-rays interact with matter differently. X-rays interact primarily with the electron cloud surrounding each atom. The contribution to the diffracted x-ray intensity is therefore larger for atoms with larger atomic number (Z). On the other hand, neutrons interact directly with the nucleus of the atom, and the contribution to the diffracted intensity depends on each isotope; for example, regular hydrogen and deuterium contribute differently. It is also often the case that light (low Z) atoms contribute strongly to the diffracted intensity, even in the presence of large Z atoms. The scattering length varies from isotope to isotope rather than linearly with the atomic number. An element like vanadium strongly scatters X-rays, but its nuclei hardly scatters neutrons, which is why it is often used as a container material. Non-magnetic neutron diffraction is directly sensitive to the positions of the nuclei of the atoms.

The nuclei of atoms, from which neutrons scatter, are tiny. Furthermore, there is no need for an atomic form factor to describe the shape of the electron cloud of the atom and the scattering power of an atom does not fall off with the scattering angle as it does for X-rays. Diffractograms therefore can show strong, well-defined diffraction peaks even at high angles, particularly if the experiment is done at low temperatures. Many neutron sources are equipped with liquid helium cooling systems that allow data collection at temperatures down to 4.2 K. The superb high angle (i.e. high resolution) information means that the atomic positions in the structure can be determined with high precision. On the other hand, Fourier maps (and to a lesser extent difference Fourier maps) derived from neutron data suffer from series termination errors, sometimes so much that the results are meaningless.

Magnetic scattering
Although neutrons are uncharged, they carry a magnetic moment, and therefore interact with magnetic moments, including those arising from the electron cloud around an atom. Neutron diffraction can therefore reveal the microscopic magnetic structure of a material.

Magnetic scattering does require an atomic form factor as it is caused by the much larger electron cloud around the tiny nucleus. The intensity of the magnetic contribution to the diffraction peaks will therefore decrease towards higher angles.

Uses
Neutron diffraction can be used to determine the static structure factor of gases, liquids or amorphous solids. Most experiments, however, aim at the structure of crystalline solids, making neutron diffraction an important tool of crystallography.

Neutron diffraction is closely related to X-ray powder diffraction. In fact, the single crystal version of the technique is less commonly used because currently available neutron sources require relatively large samples and large single crystals are hard or impossible to come by for most materials. Future developments, however, may well change this picture. Because the data is typically a 1D powder diffractogram they are usually processed using Rietveld refinement. In fact the latter found its origin in neutron diffraction (at Petten in the Netherlands) and was later extended for use in X-ray diffraction.

One practical application of elastic neutron scattering/diffraction is that the lattice constant of metals and other crystalline materials can be very accurately measured. Together with an accurately aligned micropositioner a map of the lattice constant through the metal can be derived. This can easily be converted to the stress field experienced by the material. This has been used to analyse stresses in aerospace and automotive components to give just two examples. The high penetration depth permits measuring residual stresses in bulk components as crankshafts, pistons, rails, gears. This technique has led to the development of dedicated stress diffractometers, such as the ENGIN-X instrument at the ISIS neutron source.

Neutron diffraction can also be employed to give insight into the 3D structure any material that diffracts.

Another use is for the determination of the solvation number of ion pairs in electrolytes solutions.

The magnetic scattering effect has been used since the establishment of the neutron diffraction technique to quantify magnetic moments in materials, and study the magnetic dipole orientation and structure.  One of the earliest applications of neutron diffraction was in the study of magnetic dipole orientations in antiferromagnetic transition metal oxides such as manganese, iron, nickel, and cobalt oxides.  These experiments, first performed by Clifford Shull, were the first to show the existence of the antiferromagnetic arrangement of magnetic dipoles in a material structure. Now, neutron diffraction continues to be used to characterize newly developed magnetic materials.

Hydrogen, null-scattering and contrast variation
Neutron diffraction can be used to establish the structure of low atomic number materials like proteins and surfactants much more easily with lower flux than at a synchrotron radiation source. This is because some low atomic number materials have a higher cross section for neutron interaction than higher atomic weight materials.

One major advantage of neutron diffraction over X-ray diffraction is that the latter is rather insensitive to the presence of hydrogen (H) in a structure, whereas the nuclei 1H and 2H (i.e. Deuterium, D) are strong scatterers for neutrons. The greater scattering power of protons and deuterons means that the position of hydrogen in a crystal and its thermal motions can be determined with greater precision by neutron diffraction.  The structures of metal hydride complexes, e.g., Mg2FeH6 have been assessed by neutron diffraction.

The neutron scattering lengths bH = −3.7406(11) fm  and bD = 6.671(4) fm, for H and D respectively, have opposite sign, which allows the technique to distinguish them.  In fact there is a particular isotope ratio for which the contribution of the element would cancel, this is called null-scattering.

It is undesirable to work with the relatively high concentration of H in a sample. The scattering intensity by H-nuclei has a large inelastic component, which  creates a large continuous background that is more or less independent of scattering angle. The elastic pattern typically consists of sharp Bragg reflections if the sample is crystalline. They tend to drown in the inelastic background. This is even more serious when the technique is used for the study of liquid structure. Nevertheless, by preparing samples with different isotope ratios, it is possible to vary the scattering contrast enough to highlight one element in an otherwise complicated structure. The variation of other elements is possible but usually rather expensive. Hydrogen is inexpensive and particularly interesting, because it plays an exceptionally large role in biochemical structures and is difficult to study structurally in other ways.

History
The first neutron diffraction experiments were carried out in 1945 by Ernest O. Wollan using the Graphite Reactor at Oak Ridge. He was joined shortly thereafter (June 1946) by Clifford Shull, and together they established the basic principles of the technique, and applied it successfully to many different materials, addressing problems like the structure of ice and the microscopic arrangements of magnetic moments in materials. For this achievement, Shull was awarded one half of the 1994 Nobel Prize in Physics. (Wollan died in 1984). (The other half of the 1994 Nobel Prize for Physics went to Bert Brockhouse for development of the inelastic scattering technique at the Chalk River facility of AECL. This also involved the invention of the triple axis spectrometer). The delay between the achieved work (1946) and the Nobel Prize awarded to Brockhouse and Shull (1994) brings them close to the delay between the invention by Ernst Ruska of the electron microscope (1933) - also in the field of particle optics - and his own Nobel prize (1986). This in turn is near to the record of 55 years between the discoveries of Peyton Rous and his award of the Nobel Prize in 1966.

See also
 Crystallography
 Crystallographic database
 Electron diffraction
 Inelastic neutron scattering

References

Further reading

External links 
 National Institute of Standards and Technology Center for Neutron Research
 From Bragg’s law to neutron diffraction
 Integrated Infrastructure Initiative for Neutron Scattering and Muon Spectroscopy (NMI3) - a European consortium of 18 partner organisations from 12 countries, including all major facilities in the fields of neutron scattering and muon spectroscopy
Frank Laboratory of Neutron Physics of Joint Institute for Nuclear Research (JINR)
IAEA neutron beam instrument database

Diffraction
Neutron scattering